Dubašnica was a village in the northwestern part of the island of Krk, now in Croatia, at the south of Malinska and near Poljica. It was first mentioned in the 15th century and became extinct in the 18th century as a result of a malaria epidemic. For centuries, Dubašnica was the seat of a municipality that grouped several villages in the region, but after its disappearance, the seat was moved to Bogovići and later to Malinska. Today, this municipality is known as Malinska-Dubašnica, and although its capital is still Malinska, it retains Dubašnica in its name. Nowadays, Dubašnica may also refer to a region made up of all these villages constituting the municipality of Malinska-Dubašnica.

The areas of Dubašnica and Poljica, as well as the land between the castles of Dobrinj and Omišalj, were settled by Vlachs and Morlachs (Romanians) during the second half of the 15th century. This was due to the need for more manpower by Ivan VII Frankopan, prince of the Principality of Krk since 1451. These Romanians, who originally were shepherds, would end up diverging into Istro-Romanians and would form a community on the island with their own dialect, called by some Croatian scholars as "Krko-Romanian", which ended up influencing the local Croatian dialect of the region. The last speaker of the Istro-Romanian dialect of Krk would die in 1875, although Romanian numbering would still be used in the island during the 20th century.

References

Krk
Former populated places in Croatia
Geography of Primorje-Gorski Kotar County
Regions of Croatia